Gosław may refer to the following places:
Gosław, Opole Voivodeship (south-west Poland)
Gosław, Gryfice County in West Pomeranian Voivodeship (north-west Poland)
Gosław, Koszalin County in West Pomeranian Voivodeship (north-west Poland)